Mikhail Aleksandrovich Menzbier (Russian: Михаил Александрович Мензбир; 23 October 1855 – 10 October 1935) was a Russian ornithologist.  Based in Moscow, he was a founding member of Russia's first ornithological body, the Kessler Ornithological Society.

One of his major areas of work was on the taxonomy of birds of prey.  Menzbier was a professor of comparative anatomy at Moscow University from 1886 until 1911, when he resigned in protest against the oppressive treatment of students there.  Following the Russian Revolution in 1917 he became Rector of the University.  As well as being a member of the Russian Academy of Sciences, Menzbier was elected an honorary member of the British Ornithologists' Union and the Deutsche Ornithologen-Gesellschaft, and a corresponding member of the Zoological Society of London, of the Société zoologique de France and the American Ornithologists' Union.  He is commemorated in the names of Menzbier's marmot and the Menzbier Ornithological Society.

Menzbier was a supporter of Darwinism. He has been described as "one of the most consistent defenders of the classical Darwinian approach to the struggle for existence and of the selection theory in general."

References

1855 births
1935 deaths
Corresponding members of the Saint Petersburg Academy of Sciences
Full Members of the USSR Academy of Sciences
Honorary Members of the USSR Academy of Sciences
Russian ornithologists
Rectors of Moscow State University
Soviet ornithologists